The Dubs Star Football and Hurling Challenge is an annual exhibition match played on New Year's Day between Dublin and a select Dub Stars team in both codes of Gaelic football and hurling.

2017

Football

Hurling

References

Sport in County Dublin